An innocent owner defense is a concept in United States law providing for an affirmative defense that applies when an owner claims innocence of a crime and so the property should not be forfeited. It is defined in section 983(d) of title 18 of the United States Code and is part of the Code that defines forfeiture laws and more specifically the general rules for civil forfeiture proceedings. It states that the "claimant shall have the burden of proving that the claimant is an innocent owner by a preponderance of the evidence. 

United States v. Liberty Avenue is a case in which the innocent owner defense was used.  It can be claimed when the owner can prove that he had no knowledge of illegal activity or had not consented to the illegal activity. Many property owners choosing to assert the innocent owner defense are burdened by inconsistent judicial interpretation of the statutory phrase "without the knowledge or consent of that owner." Some jurisdictions give this phrase a conjunctive meaning by requiring an owner to prove both lack of knowledge and lack of consent to defeat a forfeiture. Other jurisdictions interpret the phrase disjunctively by allowing the owner to prove either lack of knowledge or lack of consent to defeat a forfeiture action. The question in the case was whether a property owner can assert the innocent owner defense on the basis of lack of consent even if he admits to having knowledge of the drug-related use of his property. 

The government argued that to assert the innocent owner defense successfully, the claimant must show both lack of knowledge and lack of consent. Claimant, on the other hand, asserted that lack of consent represents an independent way of satisfying the requirements of the innocent owner defense and so he could thus prevail by showing that he did not consent to the criminal use of his property.

In United States v. 92 Buena Vista a woman had purchased a home with money that her boyfriend had given her without knowledge that the money came from drug-trafficking. She claimed the innocent owner defense, but the court ruled that it applied to her as well even if it was later nullified by the Civil Asset Forfeiture Reform Act of 2000. There are many jurisdictions that refuse to take any position, leaving the determination of the conjunctive or disjunctive question to the lower courts.

Moreover, courts have also inconsistently defined the statutory terms "knowledge" and "consent." The inconsistent judicial interpretation renders the standard for "innocence" under the innocent owner defense unclear.

See also
 Bennis v. Michigan

References

Asset forfeiture
Criminal defenses